The Sudan Hockey Federation (SHF) is the governing body of field hockey in Sudan. It is affiliated to IHF International Hockey Federation and AHF African Hockey Federation.

See also
African Hockey Federation

References

Sudan
Hockey